RAAF Station Tocumwal was a major Royal Australian Air Force base during World War II.

History
Located near the town of Tocumwal, New South Wales the base was established in early 1942 to provide a secure base for United States Army Air Forces heavy bomber units. While the USAAF does not appear to have used the base, it was heavily used by the RAAF and, from 1944, was home to the RAAF's heavy bomber support and operational conversion units including No. 7 Operational Training Unit.

While RAAF Station Tocumwal was closed following World War II the airfield remains in use and is a renowned gliding site.

200 houses from the base were relocated to Canberra in the 1940s to address a housing shortage. The vast majority were relocated to a small precinct in the suburb of O'Connor, and in 2004 were added to the ACT Heritage Register.

Notes

References

 Michael V. Nelmes (1994). Tocumwal to Tarakan. Australians and the Consolidated B-24 Liberator. Banner Books, Canberra.

External links

 RAAF Tocumwal: a pictorial review archived version – compiled by Geoff Goodall

Tocumwal
Riverina